Kadaru (also Kadaro, Kadero, Kaderu, Kodhin, Kodhinniai, Kodoro, Tamya) is a Hill Nubian or Kordofan Nubian language spoken in the northern Nuba Mountains in the south of Sudan. It is spoken by around 25,000 people in the Jibaal as-Sitta (Mountains of the Six) hills, between Dilling and Delami. Kordofan Nubian is a cluster of dialects also called Ajang Language with names of dialects varying according to specific clans. According to Ajang people, they all belong to one language group and although some sounds and words might have changed with time, they can understand each other quite well. It is closely related to Ghulfan, with which it forms the Kadaru-Ghulfan subgroup of Hill Nubian.

In the Middle Ages Nubian language was used as lingua franca of the Sudan and was used in writing, commerce and by the government. According to Ali Obeid Birema, Kadero should be considered as a diminishing language caused by the influence of Arabic and the ever-decreasing number of speakers.

Dialects 
Ethnologue reports that there are six dialects spoken by six clan groups living on six separate hills: Kadaru (Kodur), Kururu (Tagle), Kafir (Ka’e), Kurtala (Ngokra), Dabatna (Kaaral) and Kuldaji (Kendal). The Western form used by the Berko people at Habila (southwest of Jebel Sitta, neighbouring the Ghulfan) may be another dialect or a separate language. Since Kadaru per se is understudied, many articles on Ajang Language use examples from various dialects, based on the fact that these are closely related dialects.

Phonology

Consonants 
There are 22 consonants in Kadaru, with voiced and voiceless plosives in five places of articulation. “There is only one fricative /ʃ/ which we assign to the palatal column. There are three alveolar liquids – a lateral, a trill, and a flap – and there are two central approximants.”.

Consonants' distribution 
When it comes to the distribution, only 10 consonants were found in all the positions (initial, intervocalic and final). As seen in the table labial dental and velar consonants appear on the initial position only voiceless. The situation changes, however, in the final position where only labial and velar consonants appear, both voiceless. Contrary to Sudanese Arabic, Kadaru-Kurtala labial plosives are voiceless in the final position of the word.

ɪ́p “tail”

ʃap “giraffe”

kɔ́p “lion”

nɔ́p “gold”
tɔ́p “earth”

Consonant contrast 
Since the language lacks minimal pairs, the following table shows pairs in which the two consonants are in minimal contrast in the syllable in which they occur.

Consonant sequences 
Consonant sequences in Kadaru are considered relatively free, even including a sequence of two plosive consonants. The table below shows that the range of consonant sequences in Kadaru is bigger than in, for example, Uncu, a different Ghulfan language closely related to Kadaru.

Vowels 
In Kadaru one can identify 10 vowels distinguished by the Advanced Tongue Root dividing them into two 5 element groups.

Vowel contrasts

Vowel distribution 
Vowel distribution. Vowels appear unrestricted when it comes to the position of the phoneme in a word. However, vowels from different [ATR] sets do not appear together in a word.

Syllables and prosody 
In Kadaru-Kurtala one can find all four basic syllable types: CV, V, VC, CVC.

The four types also combine in longer words, however the language lacks the combination V.V.

Evidence shows a strong presence of long vowels both in word of one open syllable and in longer words. The evidence also suggests tonality in the language. Tagle (Kururu) language also from Jibaal as-Sitta shows more tendency of tonality with three tones: falling, high and low. Due to the lack of sufficient research, one cannot say for sure, but one could assume that Kadaru is also a tonal language, since all Ajang languages are considered tonal languages.

Orthography

Arabic script

Consonants 
One of the possible systems of writing Ajang languages is the Arabic script. ALESCO (Arab League Educational Scientific Cultural Organization) offered some solutions to how to write non-Arabic languages in Arabic script. The issue with the Arabic script is the fact that Arabic has thirteen consonants that do not exist in Ajang. Moreover, for six consonants that could be found in Ajang but not in Arabic, ALESCO suggests solutions only to three of them.

Vowels 
Vowels become even more problematic, since Arabic has only three short and three long vowels. Ajang in contrast has seven vowels. Here ALESCO also suggests a possible solution. The proposed symbols, however, are confusing and are not available on computers.

The Old Nubian Script 
The advantage of The Old Nubian is the availability of symbols for all consonants. The script becomes problematic when it comes to spelling of [+ and – ATR] vowels. The Ajang community has decided that The Old Nubian script would have to be adjusted for a better distinction between [ATR] vowels.

Adapted Roman Script 
Adapted Roman script is considered the best option for spelling of Ajang languages because of its flexibility, availability of many symbols, and the possibility to indicate tone.

Consonants: 
b [b], c [S], d [d], f [f], g [g], h [h], j [dz], k [k], 1 [1], Ir[c], m [m], n [n], ng [n], ny[n], r [r], t [t], th [t], w [w], y [j]

Vowels: 
a [a], e [e], i [i], o [o], ø [o], u [u]

Diagraphs and monographs 
Diagraphs are considered a solution to the challenge of writing of all eleven vowels present in Ajang languages. For example, Warki and Kaak use diagraphs for some consonants:

Warki: /lr/ , /th/, /ng/ and /ny/

Kaak: /dh, /th/, /rh/, /ng/ and /ny/

In order to include both the [ATR] and tonality of vowels a different solution was created. By using some symbols available on computers and by putting diacritics one could both indicate the vowel and its tone.

Alaki and Norton suggest a slightly different orthography to the one proposed by Jabr el Dar. They added ‘s’ for the palatal fricative in order to distinguish it from the palatal plosive ‘c’. They also propose umlauts for [+ATR] vowels in Kadaru, with the exception of the letter {a}. The also recommend an orthography without tone marks, since it could have negative effects on the process of writing and reading.

Grammar

Verbal number 
Uncu, closely related language to Kadaru shows evidence of verbal number in its grammatical structure. In Uncu the number of the object or subject determines participant number, whereas the event number is determined by the frequency or repetition of an event.

Participant number 
When the object of a transitive verb is plural, the extension -er is added to the root of the verb before the infliction markers. In the case of intransitive verbs, the extension -er is added to the root of the verb when the subject is plural.

1.    kɪ̄tʊ́                  kūj-ōóŋ

door.sg           open-past.2sg

“You (sg) opened a door.”

2.    kɪ̄nɪ́                  kūj-ēr-ōóŋ

door.pl            open-plr-past.2sg

“You (sg) opened doors.”

Intransitive verb:

1.    ŋāj-ōóŋ

walk-past.2sg

“You (sg) walked.”

2.    ŋāj-ēr-ūúŋ

walk-plr-past.2pl

“You (pl) walked.

Transitive verbs with a plural object or intransitive verbs with plural subject sometimes need a suppletive form including -k or -ʃ extension or involving change in vowel quality.

Event number 
Event number is used when a speaker wants to express performing of an action habitually or iteratively. It is marked by -ʈ, -ug, -k, -ʃ, -c extensions and partial reduplication of the root.

Simplex verb with a plural object

ǐ           ùljé                  òná                 ʃērg-ēr-ēé

1sg      ear.pl               1sg.gen           puncture-plr-past.1sg

“I pierced my ears.”

Repeated event verb with a singular object

ǐ           kūmé=nàá       ūrtál=gí                      wār-í-kò

1sg      rat=gen            exit-hole=acc             search-ssc-ins

tób=gí                          ʃērk-éé

ground=acc                 puncture.rep-past.1sg

“Searching for the rat exit-hole I poked the ground repeatedly.”

Noun phrase 
In Kordofan Nubian, like in many Nubian languages one can find noun phrase constructions. There are two types of noun phrases in Nubian, namely ones consisting of a noun with or without modifiers, and ones with a single person pronoun, determine or a single quantifier without any nominal modifiers.

Possessive adjective + noun 
In Kordofan Nubian possessive adjectives are derived from personal pronouns by adding the genitive linker -n. Examples from Tabaq language.

1.    SG       an

2.     SG      ʊn

3.    SG       ʈɛn/ʈan

1.     PL       ʊn

2.     PL       wun

3.    PL       ʈin

an                    uudo

1.SG.GEN       goat

‘My goat’

Determiners in Kordofan Nubian (Examples from Tabaq) 
This                 iŋ

These              ɛnɛ

That                 waŋ

Those              wanɛ 

iŋ                     dʊl

DET.SG          granary

‘this granary’

Noun + numeral/quantifier 
In Nubian numerals follow the head noun. The same happens with quantifiers.

idu                   bɛra

person             one
‘one person’
ʊʊdʊ               kimiɲ              kɔɔ
month              four                 HAVE.3SG

‘s/he has four months’

Influence of Arabic on Kadaru 
Because of the language policy in Sudan, the Arabisation of the educational system, and the fact that Arabic became the lingua franca of Sudan, indigenous languages become highly influenced by Arabic. Ali Obeid Birema studied the amount of loan words in Kadaru in many areas of life, ranging from daily life, through songs, to politics and market. In some cases, the amount of loan words in an expression was as high as 83.3% and the average percentage of loan words in the studied statements was 49.9%.

Example texts and lists of loan words

1. 
Iru robber ella tiigi robbema ogugi robbema kukuri robbema alla inɖigi onɖii robbema hamaamgi robbema ayyi haja.

Schalenjeruwa shalenjerigi eiye ʈe she, inɖi iyembergi ilɽan kuner oway kil fanongu aan kora fanongu aan ger irshu fanongu, haa laakin eiyembe illa kunen kije ʈe.

‘The people rear cows, they rear goats, and they rear chicken, and also, they rear donkeys, they breed doves anything.’

‘The wild animals I know of, and there are those which I do not know of. I only hear people talk about them. There are gazelles; there are antelopes and porcupines. I do not know them all, I only hear about them.’

Number of loan words: 6 out of 42 = 14.3% deviation

2. 
Allijir lowaariko, fi alkharif neji belkureein.

‘In summer we come in lorries, in rainy season we walk.’

Number of loan words: 5 out of 7 = 83.3% deviation

References 

Definitely endangered languages
Nubian languages
Languages of Sudan